The 2015 Breeders' Cup Challenge series provided winners of the designated races an automatic "Win and You're In" Berth in the 2015 Breeders' Cup. Races were chosen by the Breeders' Cup organization and included key prep races in the various Breeders' Cup divisions from around the world.

In 2015, eight new races were added to the series: the Gran Premio Criadores, Fleur de Lis Handicap, Sussex Stakes, Sword Dancer Invitational, Spinaway, Princess Rooney Handicap, Smile Sprint Handicap, and T. Von Zastrow Stutenpreis. Eighteen races in the series were telecast by NBC.

For 2015, 39 entrants in the Breeders’ Cup qualified via the Challenge series with six winning their respective divisions: 
 American Pharoah, who qualified for the Classic by winning the Haskell
 Stephanie's Kitten, who won the Flower Bowl to qualify for the Filly & Mare Turf
 Nyquist, winner of the FrontRunner and Juvenile
 Songbird, winner of the Chandelier and Juvenile Fillies
 Runhappy, who qualified for the Sprint by winning the Phoenix Stakes
 Catch a Glimpse, who won the Natalma to qualify for the Juvenile Fillies Turf

Several prominent winners of the challenge series races did not start in the 2015 Breeders' Cup due to injury or illness. Most notably, Beholder, who had won three challenge series races, was scratched from the Classic after she developed a fever then bled following a routine workout. Rock Fall, who was a favorite for the Sprint after qualifying in the Vosburgh, was injured during a routine workout and was euthanized.

The winners of the 2015 Breeders' Cup Challenge series races are shown below. The last column shows whether the horse was subsequently entered in the Breeders' Cup, and if so, whether they achieved a top three finish.

References

Breeders' Cup Challenge
Breeders' Cup Challenge series
Breeders' Cup